KCTJ-LP (107.1 FM) was a radio station licensed to serve Finley Point, Montana.  The station was owned by the Confederated Salish & Kootenai Tribes Disaster & Emergency Services.

KCTJ-LP broadcast a classic country music format.

History
This station received its original construction permit from the Federal Communications Commission on December 24, 2003.  The new station was assigned the KCTJ-LP call sign by the FCC on April 20, 2005.  KCTJ-LP received its license to cover from the FCC on October 5, 2005.

On December 12, 2012, the station's broadcast license was cancelled by the FCC, due to the station having been silent for longer than twelve months.

References

External links
 
Coverage area map per the FCC

CTJ-LP
Native American radio
Classic country radio stations in the United States
Radio stations established in 2005
CTJ-LP
Lake County, Montana
Radio stations disestablished in 2012
Defunct radio stations in the United States
2005 establishments in Montana
2012 disestablishments in Montana
CTJ-LP